Gatanga Constituency is an electoral constituency in Kenya. It is one of seven constituencies in Muranga County. The constituency has seven wards, all of them are within Murang'a County council. The constituency was established for the 1988 elections when the Kandara Constituency was split into two. Gatanga Constituency consists of Gatanga and Kakuzi administrative divisions, the latter was added in 2002.

Members of Parliament